The Kap Kobenhavn Formation is a geologic formation in Greenland. It preserves fossils dating back to the Neogene period.

Analysis of environmental DNA in samples from a 2006 expedition to the formation have shown the DNA is two million years old. The DNA contains evidence of mastodons, geese, poplar and birch tree. The presence of the mastodon DNA shows the mastodon range was considerably more north than previously known.

See also

 List of fossiliferous stratigraphic units in Greenland

References

 

Neogene Greenland